Thunderstruck may refer to:
 "Thunderstruck" (song), the first song on the 1990 AC/DC album The Razors Edge
 Thunderstruck (2004 film), a 2004 film about a group of AC/DC fans
 Thunderstruck (2012 film), a 2012 film about basketball
 Thunderstruck, a 2006 book of narrative non-fiction by Erik Larson
 Thunderstruck  (short story collection), a 2014 short story collection by Elizabeth McCracken that won the Story Prize
 S333 Thunderstruck, a revolver manufactured by Standard Manufacturing of New Britain, Connecticut

See also
 Thunderstrike (disambiguation)
 Thunderstuck, a one-movement orchestral composition by the American composer Christopher Rouse